Frank Woodworth Hazelbaker (August 5, 1912 – March 16, 1990) was an American politician in the state of Montana who served in the Montana House of Representatives and Montana State Senate. He was Speaker pro tempore of the House in 1945 and the Speaker of the House in 1963. His father, Frank A. Hazelbaker was a Lieutenant Governor of Montana, and his maternal grandfather, George E. Woodworth served in the Montana House of Representatives.

References

1912 births
1990 deaths
Republican Party members of the Montana House of Representatives
Speakers of the Montana House of Representatives
Republican Party Montana state senators
People from Dillon, Montana
Politicians from Missoula, Montana
20th-century American politicians
People from Ronan, Montana